Suryakant Sharma (born 10 February 1962 ) is an Indian judge of the Supreme Court of India, set to become the 53rd Chief Justice of India, if the convention of seniority is followed. Prior to his elevation as judge, Kant was a Senior Advocate and also served as the Advocate General of Haryana.

Early life
Kant was born in 1962 at Hisar district village Petwar of Haryana into a middle class family. He graduated from the Government Post Graduate College, Hisar in 1981 and earned his Bachelor of Laws from Maharishi Dayanand University, Rohtak in 1984. He stood First Class First in his Master of Laws from Kurukshetra University, Kurukshetra in 2011.

Career
Kant started his law practice at the Hisar district court of Haryana in 1984 and later shifted to the Punjab and Haryana High Court in Chandigarh in 1985. He represented multiple universities, boards, corporations, banks and various other government bodies in the High Court. He was appointed the youngest advocate general of Haryana on 7 July 2000 and was designated as senior advocate in March 2001. Kant held the office of advocate general till his elevation as a permanent judge to the Punjab and Haryana High Court on 9 January 2004. He was also nominated as a member of the National Legal Services Authority on 23 February 2007 for two consecutive terms. Kant organised and attended several prestigious conferences. On 5 October 2018, he took oath as the Chief Justice of the Himachal Pradesh High Court. On 9 May 2019, the Supreme Court collegium headed by Chief Justice Ranjan Gogoi recommended his elevation to the Supreme Court of India. On 24 May 2019, Kant took oath as a judge of the Supreme Court of India. He is set to become the 52nd Chief Justice of India, if the convention of seniority is followed.

Notable judgements
Kant has delivered numerous judgments on human rights, gender justice, education and prison reforms inter alia. During his tenure at the Punjab and Haryana High Court, he delivered the Jasvir Singh judgement, directing the State of Punjab to form a Jail Reforms Committee for creating a scheme for enabling conjugal and family visits for jail inmates keeping in mind the beneficial nature and reformatory goals of such amenities.

Notable speeches
While delivering a lecture on prison reforms at HP National Law University in May 2022, Kant discussed the effect of incarceration on prisoners’ families and recalled the novel system of prison administration called ‘break-up and weekend prison’ proposed by Justice VR Krishna Iyer.

References

1962 births
Living people
21st-century Indian judges
21st-century Indian lawyers
Chief Justices of the Himachal Pradesh High Court
Judges of the Punjab and Haryana High Court
Justices of the Supreme Court of India
Kurukshetra University alumni
People from Hisar district